The Modern Muse Charity is an online platform designed to encourage the next generation of female business leaders and entrepreneurs.

The platform, www.modernmuse.org, is aimed at girls aged eight and above; it features the professional pathways of women from all walks of life, working across business and society, with a focus on encouraging girls into science, technology, engineering, and mathematics careers.

Modern Muse seek to improve social mobility through engagement with education and by providing insight to the variety of career options, work experience, job placements, internships and apprenticeships available.

The Modern Muses 
The Modern Muse platform provides young women  to female role models.

Founders 
Karen Gill and Maxine Benson co-founded and own Everywoman, as well as Modern Muse. Both Gill and Benson were awarded an MBE in 2009 in recognition of her service to women’s enterprise.

References

External links 
 https://www.modernmuse.org/#/

Social enterprises
Educational organizations
Technology organizations